Town Hall (Castle Hall), also known as the Zionsville Town Hall, is a historic town hall located at Zionsville, Boone County, Indiana.  It was built in 1902, and is a two-story, rectangular red brick building measuring 54 feet wide and 80 feet deep.  It features a stepped gable end.  The interior was remodeled in 1935 to house a movie theater.  The building also housed a local chapter of the Knights of Pythias.

It was listed on the National Register of Historic Places in 1983.

References

City and town halls on the National Register of Historic Places in Indiana
Government buildings completed in 1902
Buildings and structures in Boone County, Indiana
National Register of Historic Places in Boone County, Indiana